Darton is a surname. Notable people with the surname include:
F. J. Harvey Darton (1878–1936), Historian, biographer and critic
Nelson Horatio Darton (1865–1948), American geologist
Richard Darton (born 1948), British engineer and scientist
Scott Darton (born 1975), English soccer player
William Darton (1755–1819), English book publisher

See also

Danton (name)